The 1997 Asian Women's Volleyball Championship was the ninth edition of the Asian Championship, a biennial international volleyball tournament organised by the Asian Volleyball Confederation (AVC) with Philippine Volleyball Federation (PVF). The tournament was held in Manila, Philippines from 21 to 28 September 1997.

Pools composition
The teams are seeded based on their final ranking at the 1995 Asian Women's Volleyball Championship.

Preliminary round

Pool A

|}

|}

Pool B

|}

|}

Final round
 The results and the points of the matches between the same teams that were already played during the preliminary round shall be taken into account for the final round.

Classification 5th–8th

|}

|}

Championship

|}

|}

Final standing

Awards
Best Scorer:  Sun Yue
Best Spiker:  Sun Yue

References
Results (Archived 2009-05-11)

V
A
Asian women's volleyball championships
Volleyball